Fábio Porchat (born July 1, 1983) is a Brazilian actor, humorist, comedian, television host and writer.

Biography 
Winner of the International Emmy in 2019, for the Comedy Special “Porta dos Fundos Christmas Special (The Last Hangover)” produced by Porta dos Fundos for Netflix, Fábio Porchat was born in Rio de Janeiro. He is the son of politician, screenwriter and businessman Fabio Ferrari Porchat de Assis and  Isabella Thereza Christina Robinson. When he was still a baby, he moved with his family to São Paulo, where he lived until he was 19 years old. He declares himself an atheist.

Career 
Before entering the world of the arts, Porchat studied Administration at ESPM in São Paulo, but decided to put studies in the background to focus on acting career. He moved to Rio de Janeiro and enrolled in the drama course at CAL – Casa de Artes das Laranjeiras. His TV career started when he went to the "Programa do Jô" in 2002, to present a parody of the sitcom "Os Normais" and then was invited for auditions for TV Globo.

In 2005, alongside the comedian Paulo Gustavo, Porchat took the stage first with a piece of his own, "Infraturas". The following year, the actor was recognized for participating in the first group of stand up comedy from Brazil, "Comédia em Pé". Porchat was in the show until 2011 and soon spawned another hit with the solo show "Fora do Normal".

Porchat's career took off with the comedy group Porta dos Fundos' YouTube videos in 2012, alongside João Vicente de Castro, Antonio Pedro Tabet, Gregório Duvivier and Ian SBF, where he participates in the creative team, screenplay and acting. In little more than six months of the project, the channel had reached the milestone of garnering 30 million views.

Filmography

Film

Internet productions

References

External links
 
 

1983 births
Living people
Male actors from Rio de Janeiro (city)
Brazilian people of Italian descent
Brazilian people of Swiss descent
Brazilian people of English descent
Brazilian people of Portuguese descent
Brazilian male film actors
Brazilian male comedians
Brazilian television presenters